Smita Rao Bellur is a Hindustani classical (Khyal) and Sufi devotional singer (Qawwali) and musician. She belongs to the Kirana gharana of Jaipur, a musical specialist school.

Life and career
Bellur is from North Karnataka. 

She regularly broadcasts as a graded artiste (B High) from India’s national broadcasting network-  All India Radio/Doordarshan, and from media/TV Networks and radio channels such as ETV Urdu/Kannada, Zee, Doordarshan, TV9 and Suvarna/Asianet and All India Radio/Doordarshan, FM channels such as 92.7BIG FM in addition to Twaang, Apple music, Spotify, Gaana, Saavn, Wynk, Hungama and Amazon music etc.

Smita has earlier been a senior faculty at the Shankar Mahadevan Academy. In addition, she also works on a fellowship research project by the Karnataka Sangeeta Nritya Academy and the India Foundation for the Arts.

She holds a master's degree MS (QM) from BITS Pilani and Bachelor of Engineering (Bangalore University) and has earlier worked in software multi-national companies like FirstApex, Oracle, and the German software giant SAP, before giving it up to focus full-time on her passion-turned-profession.

Music training
She has trained from P.R. Bhagwat, Arjunsa Nakod, briefly from Rajabhau Sontakke (disciple of Omkarnath Thakur) and Bhalachandra Nakod. She is currently studying under Alka Dev Marulkar for khyal and Naasir–Nazeer Ahmed Warsi (Warsi Brothers) of Hyderabad (grandsons of Padmashri Aziz Ahmed Warsi) for Sufiana music/Qawwali rendition. She is trained in Sufism by Dr. Ejazuddin Ashrafi and Syed ZIa Alvi of Delhi.

Audio releases 
 Na Aaye Wo Na To (Ghazal)
 Kaisi Madhur Shyam (Bhajan, Holi, Chaiti). For the End Polio campaign by Rotary International)
 Vachana Kirana (Shiva Sharana, Vachana)

References

External links
 
 
 
 

Year of birth missing (living people)
Living people
Bangalore University alumni
People from Uttara Kannada
Indian women engineers
Singers from Karnataka
Indian software engineers
Engineers from Karnataka
Women Hindustani musicians
20th-century Indian singers
20th-century Indian women singers
21st-century women engineers